The following Union Army units and commanders fought in the Battle of Atlanta (July 22, 1864) of the American Civil War. The Confederate order of battle is listed separately.

Abbreviations used

Military Rank
 MG = Major General
 BG = Brigadier General
 Col = Colonel
 Maj = Major
 Cpt = Captain

Other
 w = wounded
 k = killed

Military Division of the Mississippi

MG William T. Sherman

Army of the Tennessee

MG James B. McPherson (k)
MG John A. Logan

XV Corps

MG John A. Logan
BG Morgan L. Smith

XVI Corps (Left Wing)

MG Grenville M. Dodge

XVII Corps

MG Francis P. Blair, Jr.

Notes

References
 Atlanta, Georgia
 Eicher, John H., and Eicher, David J., Civil War High Commands, Stanford University Press, 2001, .

American Civil War orders of battle
Atlanta campaign